Streptomyces abietis is a cellulolytic bacterium species from the genus Streptomyces which was isolated from topsoil of a pine forest from the Hokkaido prefecture in Japan.

See also 
 List of Streptomyces species

References

Further reading

External links
Type strain of Streptomyces abietis at BacDive -  the Bacterial Diversity Metadatabase

abietis
Bacteria described in 2013